Tennena Cone is a subglacial mound in northern British Columbia, Canada, located just southwest of Mount Edziza in Mount Edziza Provincial Park.

See also
List of volcanoes in Canada
List of Northern Cordilleran volcanoes
Volcanism of Canada
Volcanism of Western Canada

References

External links

Mount Edziza volcanic complex
Subglacial mounds of Canada
Holocene volcanoes
Monogenetic volcanoes
Two-thousanders of British Columbia